This article covers the history of the Liberal Party of Canada.

Party systems model 
According to recent scholarship, there have been four party systems in Canada at the federal level since Confederation, each with its own distinctive pattern of social support, patronage relationships, leadership styles, and electoral strategies.<ref>Alain-G. Gagnon, and A. Brain  Tanguay, Canadian Parties in Transition (3rd ed. 2007)</ref>  Steve Patten identifies four party systems in Canada's political history
 The first party system emerged from pre-Confederation colonial politics, had its "heyday" from 1896 to 1911 and lasted until the Conscription Crisis of 1917, and was characterized by local patronage administered by the two largest parties, the Liberals and the Conservatives.
 The second system emerged following the First World War, and had its heyday from 1935 and 1957, was characterized by regionalism and saw the emergence of several protest parties, such as the Progressives, the Social Credit Party, and the Co-operative Commonwealth Federation.
 The third system emerged in 1963 and had its heyday from 1968 to 1983 and began to unravel thereafter.  The two largest parties were challenged by a strong third party, the New Democratic Party. Campaigns during this era became more national in scope due to the electronic media, and involved a greater focus on leadership. The dominant policy of the era was Keynesian economics.
 The fourth party system has involved the rise of the Reform Party, the Bloc Québécois, and the merger of the Canadian Alliance with the Progressive Conservatives. It saw most parties move to one-member-one-vote leadership contests, and a major reform to campaign finance laws in 2004.  The fourth party system has been characterized by market-oriented policies that abandoned Keynesian policies, but maintained the welfare state.

Clarkson (2005) shows how the Liberal Party had dominated all the party systems, using different approaches. It began with a  "clientelistic approach" under Sir Wilfrid Laurier, which evolved into a "brokerage" system of the 1920s, 1930s and 1940s under William Lyon Mackenzie King. The 1950s saw the emergence of a "pan-Canadian system", which lasted until the 1990s. The 1993 election — categorized by Clarkson as an electoral "earthquake" which "fragmented" the party system, saw the emergence of regional politics within a four party-system, whereby various groups championed regional issues and concerns. Clarkson concludes that the inherent bias built into the first-past-the-post system, had chiefly benefited the Liberals.

19th century

Origins

The Liberals are descended from the mid-19th century Reformers who agitated for responsible government throughout British North America. These included George Brown, Robert Baldwin, William Lyon Mackenzie and the Clear Grits in Upper Canada, Joseph Howe in Nova Scotia, and the Patriotes and Rouges in Lower Canada led by figures such as Louis-Joseph Papineau.  The Clear Grits and Parti rouge sometimes functioned as a united bloc in the legislature of the Province of Canada beginning in 1854, and a united Liberal Party combining both English and French Canadian members was formed in 1861.

Confederation
At the time of confederation of the former British colonies of Canada (now Ontario and Quebec), New Brunswick and Nova Scotia, the radical Liberals were marginalized by the more pragmatic Conservative coalition assembled under Sir John A. Macdonald. In the 29 years after Canadian confederation, the Liberals were consigned to opposition, with the exception of one stint in government.  Alexander Mackenzie was able to lead the party to power in 1873 after the Macdonald government lost a vote of no confidence in the House of Commons because of the Pacific Scandal.  Mackenzie won the 1874 election, but lost the government to Macdonald in 1878. Liberals spent the next 18 years in opposition.

In dealing with labour unions, the laissez-faire Liberals under Mackenzie, George Brown and Edward Blake were anti-labour, while Conservatives under Macdonald were pro-labour in the process of making their National Policy work to raise wages (and profits) by imposing a tariff on imports. Macdonald was an important financial supporter of the labor newspaper and friend of trade-union leaders, who in turn aided his party during the election campaigns of the decade.

Provinces
In Ontario, the Liberal Party under Oliver Mowat controlled the provincial government and advocated the rights of provinces.  He was in close touch with Catholic officials, and received the Irish Catholic vote.

In Prince Edward Island during the 1860s the issue of confederation split the colony's Conservative Party leadership in 1864–65, but after that the central issues were sectarianism and absentee landownership. The defection of rural supporters from the Conservatives allowed the Liberals to win the 1867 provincial election. But the issue of denominational grants to schools cost the Liberals their Roman Catholic support in 1870, and resulted in a coalition government that ruled the island for 17 of the next 21 years.

The Nova Scotia Liberal Party fared poorly in national elections during the 1880s and early 1890s. The national party advocated policies that would discontinue the national coal subsidy and, for all practical purposes, eliminate Catholic schools in Manitoba, policies disliked by provincial coal miners and Catholics respectively. William Stevens Fielding influenced a more moderate coal policy and defused the school issue. Thus in 1896 the provincial Liberals improved their showing in the national election.

Laurier era

In their early history, the Liberals were the party of  continentalism (free trade with the United States), and opposition to imperialism. The Liberals also became identified with the aspirations of Quebecers as a result of the growing hostility of French-Canadians to the Conservatives.  The Conservatives lost the support of Quebecers because of the perceived role of Conservative governments in the execution of Louis Riel, and their role in the Conscription crisis of 1917.

It was not until Wilfrid Laurier became leader that the Liberal Party emerged as a modern party. Laurier was able to capitalize on the Tories' apparent alienation of French Canada by offering the Liberals as a credible alternative. Laurier was able to overcome the party's reputation for anti-clericalism that offended the still-powerful Quebec Roman Catholic Church. In English-speaking Canada, the Liberal Party's support for free trade made it popular among farmers, and helped cement the party's hold in the growing prairie provinces.

Laurier led the Liberals to power in the 1896 election (in which he became the first Francophone Prime Minister), and oversaw a government that increased immigration in order to settle Western Canada. Laurier's government created the provinces of Saskatchewan and Alberta out of the North-West Territories, and promoted the development of Canadian industry.

20th century

Loss of power
The Liberals lost power in the 1911 election due to opposition to the party's policies on reciprocity (or free trade), and the creation of a Canadian navy.

The Conscription crisis divided the party as many Liberals in English Canada supported conscription.  Many of them joined Sir Robert Borden's Conservatives to form a Unionist government. With numerous Liberal candidates running as Unionists or Liberal-Unionists with the support of provincial Liberal parties in a number of provinces, the Laurier Liberals were reduced to a largely Quebec-based rump. The long-term impact of the Conscription crisis benefited the party as the issue only added to the animosity of French-Canadians towards the Conservatives, making that party unpopular in Quebec for decades.

Canadian sovereignty

Under Laurier, and his successor William Lyon Mackenzie King, the Liberals promoted Canadian sovereignty and greater independence from the British Empire. In Imperial Conferences held throughout the 1920s, Canadian Liberal governments often took the lead in arguing that the United Kingdom and the dominions should have equal status, and against proposals for an imperial parliament that would have subsumed Canadian independence. After the King-Byng Affair of 1926, the Liberals argued that the Governor General of Canada should no longer be appointed on the recommendation of the British government. The decisions of the Imperial Conferences were formalized in the Statute of Westminster, which was actually passed in 1931, the year after the Liberals lost power.

The Liberals also promoted the idea of Canada being responsible for its own foreign and defence policy. Initially, it was Britain which determined external affairs for the dominion. In 1905, Laurier created the Department of External Affairs, and in 1909 he advised Governor General Earl Grey to appoint the first Secretary of State for External Affairs to Cabinet. It was also Laurier who first proposed the creation of a Canadian Navy in 1910.  Mackenzie King recommended the appointment by Governor General Lord Byng of Vincent Massey as the first Canadian ambassador to Washington in 1926, marking the Liberal government's insistence on having direct relations with the United States, rather than having Britain act on Canada's behalf.

Liberals and the social safety net

In the period just before and after the Second World War, the party became a champion of 'progressive social policy'.

As Prime Minister for most of the time between 1921 and 1948, King introduced several measures that led to the creation of Canada's social safety net.  Bowing to popular pressure, he introduced the mother's allowance, a monthly payment to all mothers with young children. He also reluctantly introduced old age pensions when J. S. Woodsworth required it in exchange for his Co-operative Commonwealth Federation party's support of King's minority government. Later, Lester B. Pearson introduced universal health care, the Canada Pension Plan, Canada Student Loans, and the Canada Assistance Plan (which provided funding for provincial welfare programs).

Trudeau era

Under Pierre Trudeau, the mission of a progressive social policy evolved into the goal of creating a "just society".

The Trudeau Liberals became the champions of official bilingualism, passing the Official Languages Act, which gave the French and English languages equal status in Canada. Trudeau hoped that the promotion of bilingualism would cement Quebec's place in confederation, and counter growing calls for an independent Quebec.  This policy aimed to transform Canada into a country where English and French-Canadians could live together in comfort and could move to any part of the country without losing their language. While this has not occurred, official bilingualism has helped halt the French language decline outside of Quebec. It has also ensured that all federal government services (as well as radio and television services provided by the government-owned Canadian Broadcasting Corporation/Radio-Canada) are available in both languages throughout the country.

The Trudeau Liberals are also credited with support for official multiculturalism as a means of integrating immigrants into Canadian society without forcing them to shed their culture.  As a result of this and a more sympathetic attitude by Liberals towards immigration policy, the party has built a support base among recent immigrants and their children.

The most lasting effect of the Trudeau years has been the patriation of the Canadian constitution and the creation of Canada's Charter of Rights.  Trudeau Liberals support the concept of a strong, central government, and fought Quebec separatism,  other forms of Quebec nationalism, and the granting of "distinct society" status to Quebec. Such actions, however, served as rallying cries for sovereigntists & alienated many francophone Quebecers

The other primary legacy of the Trudeau years has been financial. Net federal debt in fiscal 1968, just before Trudeau became Prime Minister, was about $18-billion, or 26 percent of a gross domestic product; by his final year in office, it had ballooned to $206-billion– at 46 percent of GDP, nearly twice as large relative to the economy.

From the fiscal years 1976 to 1985, the government ran not only an overall deficit but an operating deficit. The overall deficit throughout the latter phase never fell below 3 percent of GDP; it averaged 5.6 percent. In the final year of Liberal rule, 1984–85, total spending exceeded revenues by more than 50 percent. The deficit that year, at $38.5 billion, was equal to nearly 9 percent of GDP. Interest payments alone were now enough to consume nearly one-third of all revenues dollar. With interest costs compounding at a rate of 13 percent per year, the debt doubled every three or four years.

The post-Trudeau party in opposition

After Trudeau's retirement in 1984, many Liberals, such as Jean Chrétien and Clyde Wells, continued to adhere to Trudeau's concept of federalism. Others, such as John Turner, supported the failed Meech Lake and Charlottetown Constitutional Accords, which would have recognized Quebec as a "distinct society" and would have increased the powers of the provinces to the detriment of the federal government.

Trudeau stepped down as Prime Minister and party leader in 1984, as the Liberals were slipping in polls. At that year's leadership convention, Turner defeated Chrétien on the second ballot to become Prime Minister. Immediately, upon taking office, Turner called a snap election, citing favourable internal polls. However, party was hurt by numerous patronage appointments, many of which Turner had made supposedly in return for Trudeau retiring early. Also, they were unpopular in their traditional stronghold of Quebec due to the constitution repatriation which excluded that province. The Liberals lost power in the 1984 election, and were reduced to only 40 seats in the House of Commons. The Progressive Conservatives won a majority of the seats in every province, including Quebec.  The 95-seat loss was the worst defeat in the party's history, and the worst defeat at the time for a governing party at the federal level.  What was more, the New Democratic Party, successor to the CCF, won only ten fewer seats than the Liberals, and some thought that the NDP under Ed Broadbent would push the Liberals to third-party status.

The party began a long process of reconstruction.  A small group of young Liberal MPs, known as the Rat Pack, gained fame by criticizing the Tory government of Brian Mulroney at every turn. Also, despite public and backroom attempts to remove Turner as leader, he managed to consolidate his leadership at the 1986 review.

The 1988 election was notable for Turner's strong opposition to the Canada-U.S. Free Trade Agreement negotiated by Progressive Conservative Prime Minister Brian Mulroney. Although most Canadians voted for parties opposed to free trade, the Tories were returned with a majority government, and implemented the deal.  The Liberals recovered from their near-meltdown of 1984, however, winning 83 seats and ending much of the talk of being eclipsed by the NDP.

The party under Chrétien

Turner resigned in 1990 due to growing discontent within the party with his leadership, and was replaced by bitter rival Jean Chrétien, who had served in every Liberal cabinet since 1965. Chrétien's Liberals campaigned in the 1993 election on the promise of renegotiating the North American Free Trade Agreement (NAFTA), and eliminating the Goods and Services Tax (GST).  Just after the writ was dropped for the election, they issued the Red Book, a detailed statement of exactly what the Liberals would do in office if they won power.  This was unprecedented for a Canadian party.  Taking full advantage of the inability of Mulroney's successor, Kim Campbell to overcome a large amount of antipathy toward Mulroney, they won a strong majority government with 177 seats—the third-best performance in party history, and their best since 1949.  The Progressive Conservatives were cut down to only two seats, suffering a defeat even more severe than the one they had handed the Liberals nine years earlier.  The Liberals were re-elected with a considerably reduced majority in 1997, but nearly tied their 1993 total in 2000. 

For the next decade, the Liberals dominated Canadian politics in a fashion not seen since the early years of Confederation.  This was because of the destruction of the "grand coalition" of Western socially conservative populists, Quebec nationalists, and fiscal conservatives from Ontario that had supported the Progressive Conservatives in 1984 and 1988.  The PCs' Western support, for all practical purposes, transferred en masse to the Western-based Reform Party, which replaced the PCs as the major right-wing party in Canada.  However, the new party's agenda was seen as too conservative for most Canadians.  It only won one seat east of Manitoba in an election (but gained another in a floor-crossing).  Even when Reform restructured into the Canadian Alliance, the party was virtually nonexistent east of Manitoba, winning only 66 seats in 2000.  Reform/Alliance was the official opposition from 1997 to 2003, but was never able to overcome wide perceptions that it was merely a Western protest party.  The Quebec nationalists who had once supported the Tories largely switched their support to the sovereigntist Bloc Québécois, while the Tories' support in Ontario and the Atlantic provinces largely moved to the Liberals.  The PCs would never be a major force in Canadian politics again; while they rebounded to 20 seats in the next election, they won only two seats west of Quebec in the next decade.

Ontario and Quebec are guaranteed a majority of seats in the House of Commons under both Constitution Acts (59 percent of the seats).  As a result, it is very difficult to form even a minority government without substantial support in Ontario and/or Quebec.  It is mathematically impossible to form a majority government without winning the most seats in either Ontario or Quebec. While it is mathematically possible to form a minority government without a strong base in either province, but such an undertaking is politically difficult. The Liberals were the only party with a strong base in both provinces, thus making them the only party capable of forming a government.

There was some disappointment as Liberals were not able to recover their traditional dominant position in Quebec, despite being led by a Quebecer from a strongly nationalist region of Quebec.  The Bloc capitalized on discontent with the failure of the 1990 Meech Lake Accord and Chrétien's uncompromising stance on federalism (see below) to win the most seats in Quebec in every election from 1993 onward, even serving as the official opposition from 1993 to 1997. Chrétien's reputation in his home province never recovered after the 1990 leadership convention when rival Paul Martin forced him to declare his opposition to the Meech Lake Accord.  However, the Liberals did increase their support in the next two elections due to infighting within the Bloc. In the 1997 election, although the Liberals finished with a thin majority, it was their gains in Quebec which were credited with offsetting their losses in the Maritime provinces. In particular, the 2000 election was a breakthrough for the Liberals after the PQ government's unpopular initiatives regarding consolidation of several Quebec urban areas into "megacities."  Many federal Liberals also took credit for Charest's provincial election victory over the PQ in spring 2003. A series of by-elections allowed the Liberals to gain a majority of Quebec ridings for the first time since 1984.

The Chrétien Liberals more than made up for their shortfall in Quebec by building a strong base in Ontario. They reaped a substantial windfall from the votes of fiscally conservative and socially liberal voters who had previously voted Tory, as well as rapid growth in the Greater Toronto Area.  They were also able to take advantage of massive vote splitting between the Tories and Reform/Alliance in rural areas of the province that had traditionally formed the backbone of provincial Tory governments.  Combined with their historic dominance of Metro Toronto and northern Ontario, the Liberals dominated the province's federal politics even as the Tories won landslide majorities at the provincial level. In 1993, for example, the Liberals won all but one seat in Ontario, and came within 123 votes in Simcoe Centre of pulling off the first clean sweep of Canada's most populated province.  They were able to retain their position as the largest party in the House by winning all but two seats in Ontario in the 1997 election.  The Liberals were assured of at least a minority government once the Ontario results came in, but it was not clear until later in the night that they would retain their majority.  In 2000, the Liberals won all but three seats in Ontario.

While the Chrétien Liberals campaigned from the left, their time in power is most marked by the cuts made to many programs in order to balance the federal budget.  Chrétien had supported the Charlottetown Accord while in opposition, but in power opposed major concessions to Quebec and other provincialist factions. In contrast to their promises during the 1993 campaign, they implemented only minor changes to NAFTA, embraced the free trade concept and– with the exception of the replacement of the GST with the Harmonized Sales Tax in some Atlantic provinces– broke their promise to replace the GST.

After a proposal for Quebec independence was narrowly defeated in the 1995 Quebec referendum, the Liberals passed the "Clarity Act" Clarity Act  which outlines the federal government's preconditions for negotiating provincial independence. In Chrétien's final days, he supported same-sex marriage in Canada as well as decriminalizing the possession of small quantities of marijuana. Chrétien displeased the United States government when he pledged on March 17, 2003 that Canada would not support the 2003 invasion of Iraq. Polling released a month later showed the decision was largely popular, with 62% in favour of the Prime Minister's decision, and 35% opposed. Later polls would increase that margin of support.

Into the 21st century

Martin succeeds Chrétien

Paul Martin succeeded Chrétien as party leader and prime minister in 2003.  Despite the personal rivalry between the two, Martin was the architect of the Liberals' economic policies as Minister of Finance during the 1990s. Chrétien left office with a high approval rating and Martin was expected to take the Liberals to greater heights. While his cabinet choices provoked some controversy over excluding many Chrétien supporters, it at first did little to hurt his popularity. However, the political situation changed with the revelation of the sponsorship scandal, in which advertising agencies supporting the Liberal Party received grossly inflated commissions for their services.

Having faced a divided conservative opposition for the past three elections, Liberals were seriously challenged by competition from the newly united Conservative Party led by Stephen Harper. The infighting between Martin and Chrétien's supporters also dogged the party. Nonetheless, by criticizing the Conservatives' social policies, the Liberals were able to draw progressive votes from the NDP which made the difference in several close races. On June 28, 2004 federal election, the Martin Liberals retained enough support to continue as the government, though they were reduced to a minority.

In the ensuing months, testimony from the Gomery Commission caused public opinion to turn sharply against the Liberals for the first time in over a decade.  Despite the devastating revelations, only two Liberal MPs--David Kilgour (who had, ironically, crossed the floor from the PC Party in 1990) and Pat O'Brien—left the party for reasons other than the scandal.  Belinda Stronach, who crossed the floor from the Conservatives to the Liberals, gave Martin the number of votes needed, although barely, to hold onto power when an NDP-sponsored amendment to his budget was passed only by the Speaker's tiebreaking vote on May 19, 2005.

In November, the Liberals dropped in polls following the release of the first Gomery Report. Nonetheless, Martin turned down the NDP's conditions for continued support, as well as rejected an opposition proposal which would schedule a February 2006 election in return for passing several pieces of legislation. The Liberals thus lost the no-confidence vote on November 28; Martin thus became only the fifth prime minister to lose the confidence of the House, but the first to lose on a straight no-confidence motion.  Due to the Christmas holiday, Martin advised Governor General Michaëlle Jean to dissolve Parliament and call an election for January 2006.

The Liberal campaign was dogged from start to finish by the sponsorship scandal, which was brought up by a Royal Canadian Mounted Police (RCMP) criminal investigation into the leak of the income trust announcement.  Numerous gaffes, contrasting with a smoothly run Conservative campaign, put Liberals as many as ten points behind the Conservatives in opinion polling.  They managed to recover some of their momentum by election night, but not enough to retain power.  They won 103 seats, a net loss of 30 from when the writs were dropped, losing a similar number of seats in Ontario and Quebec to the Tories.  However, the Liberals managed to capture the most seats in Ontario for the fifth straight election (54 to the Tories' 40), holding the Conservatives to a minority government. While the Conservatives captured many of Ontario's rural ridings, the Liberals retained most of the population-rich Greater Toronto Area.  Many of these ridings, particularly the 905 region, had historically been bellwethers (the Liberals were nearly shut out of this region in 1979 and 1984), but demographic changes have resulted in high Liberal returns in recent years.

Martin resigned as parliamentary leader after the election and stepped down as Liberal leader on March 18, having previously promised to step down if he didn't win a plurality.

In Opposition and 2006 convention

Bill Graham was appointed interim party and parliamentary leader and the process to select a new party leader began. An unusually large number of prominent members such as Frank McKenna, Brian Tobin,
Allan Rock and Belinda Stronach declined to run, yet at the same time many new faces stepped forward. There were eight people running for the leadership of the Liberal Party  at the time of the convention:

Martha Hall Findlay
Stéphane Dion
Michael Ignatieff
Gerard Kennedy
Bob Rae
Scott Brison
Ken Dryden
Joe Volpe

The Liberal Party reportedly felt they could quickly regain power, so they accelerated the leadership selection process. While there were some predictions the party's National Executive would call the convention for as late as March 2007, it instead decided to announce the convention for the first weekend of December 2006.

On December 2 in Montreal, the Liberals voted for their new party leader. The first ballot results had Michael Ignatieff leading the pack with 30% of the delegates, Bob Rae second with 20%, and Stéphane Dion and Gerard Kennedy in third and fourth respectively with 16% of the votes each. The remaining contenders gathered less than 5% of the first ballot vote and Martha Hall Findlay was eliminated as she came in last on the first ballot, she endorsed Stéphane Dion for leader before voting began for the second ballot the next morning.  Before voting began for the second ballot, Scott Brison and Joe Volpe voluntarily dropped out of the race, and both endorsed Bob Rae. The second ballot results showed Ignatieff again leading the way, with Rae in second, Dion in third, Kennedy in fourth, and Dryden in fifth. Dryden was thus eliminated, and he endorsed Bob Rae as well. Kennedy dropped out of the race and endorsed Stéphane Dion. Thus the third ballot came down to only Ignatieff, Rae and Dion. Dion jumped to first on the third ballot with Ignatieff and Rae falling to second and third respectively. Rae was eliminated, and Dion was elected leader over Ignatieff on the fourth ballot.

On May 11, 2006, Montreal's La Presse reported that the Government of Canada will file a lawsuit against the Liberal Party to recover all the money missing in the sponsorship program. Scott Brison told reporters that same day that the Liberals has already paid back the $1.14 million into the public purse, however the Conservatives believe that there is as much as $40 million unaccounted for in the sponsorship program.

On September 28, 2007, party national director Jamie Carroll, was criticized for comments he allegedly made in response to a suggestion that the Liberals should hire more francophone Quebecers to appeal to francophone voters. According to some persons present at a private meeting, Carroll said "Do we also have to hire people from the Chinese community to represent the Chinese community?". He later indicated that a statement he made was taken out of context. Several Quebec MPs and the president of the party's Quebec wing said that Carroll was quoted correctly, with Pablo Rodriguez and Liza Frulla demanding that he be fired. Dion affirmed Carroll's version of events, and rejected calls for his dismissal.  Carroll initially threatened to sue for defamation and demand 12 to 18 months of severance, though Dion later had him quietly reassigned to another position.

British Columbia MP Blair Wilson was resigned from caucus and the shadow cabinet, after the Vancouver Province charged that he was involved in unlawful off-the-books cash spending, and that his private businesses had numerous discrepancies and unpaid debts. Wilson, who is being investigated, has denied the allegations.

 Majority under Trudeau 
For much of its history, the Liberal Party has been referred to as "Canada's Natural Governing Party", due to the party's election success and a weak Conservative Opposition. In the aftermath of the Liberal Party's poor performance in the 2011 federal election, there was speculation that the Conservative Party was in a position to replace the Liberals in that unofficial status but the Liberal party won a majority government again in 2015.

Leaders of the Liberal Party since 1867

Notes:

1 Brown was regarded by most Liberal candidates as their leader in the 1867 election but did not officially hold the title. Had he won a seat he would have almost certainly become Leader of the Opposition and had the Liberals won enough seats to form a government Brown would almost certainly have become Prime Minister. However, he failed in his bid for a seat in the House of Commons and the Liberals had no official leader until 1873.

2 Herb Gray served as Leader of the Opposition from February 6 until Chrétien was re-elected to Parliament, and took his seat on December 21, 1990. He led the Liberal Party in parliament, though he was never the leader or interim leader of the Liberal Party as a whole.

3 After the defeat of the Liberals by the Conservatives of Stephen Harper in the 2006 Canadian federal election, held on January 26, Paul Martin announced in the early hours of January 27, 2006 his intention to resign the leadership of the Liberal Party. Bill Graham was later selected as parliamentary leader by caucus, while Martin indicated he would remain nominal party leader. On March 18, 2006, Graham was appointed interim leader after Martin officially stepped down from the post.

The Liberal Party held its first leadership convention in 1919, electing William Lyon Mackenzie King as leader. Prior to that party leaders were chosen by caucus.

Presidents of the Liberal Party since 1932

 Election results

 1953-1968 includes one Liberal-Labour Member of Parliament.
* In 1917, some Liberals ran under the Unionist banner, figures only count those who ran as "Laurier Liberals"

Further reading
 Bickerton, James, and Alain G. Gagnon. Canadian Politics (5th ed. 2009), 415pp; university textbook
 Bliss, Michael. Right Honourable Men: The Descent of Canadian Politics from Macdonald to Mulroney (1994), essays on Prime Ministers
  Clarkson, Stephen. The Big Red Machine: How the Liberal Party Dominates Canadian Politics (2005)
 Cohen, Andrew, J. L. Granatstein, eds. Trudeau's Shadow: the life and legacy of Pierre Elliott Trudeau (1999).
 Gagnon, Alain G. and Brian Tanguay. Canadian Parties in Transition (3rd ed. 2007), 574pp; university textbook
 Granatstein, J.L. Mackenzie King: His Life and World (1977).
  Hillmer, Norman, and Steven Azzi. "Canada's Best Prime Ministers," Maclean's June 20, 2011 online
 
  Neatby, H. Blair. Laurier and a Liberal Quebec: A Study in Political Management (1973)
 
 Whitaker, Reginald. The Government Party: Organizing and Financing the Liberal Party of Canada, 1930-1958'' (1977)

References

Liberal Party of Canada
Liberal Party of Canada
Liberal Party of Canada
Liberal Party